Osteochilus vittatus is a species of cyprinid fish from Southeast Asia.  Its common name is bonylip barb, hard-lipped barb, or silver sharkminnow. It grows to  SL.

Distribution 
The species is widely distributed in the Malay Peninsular and Indochina as well as southern China (Yunnan), Java, Sumatra, and Borneo. It occurs in the Salween, Mekong and Chao Phraya basins, as well as in many smaller drainages.

Habitat 
It inhabits a wide range of freshwater habitats: lowland marshlands, lakes, peat swamps, rivers, and hill streams. It is usually associated with slow-flowing large streams with muddy to sandy rocky bottom.

Diet 
Adults feed on aquatic plants and particularly the roots of the plants (Hydrilla verticillata), unicellular algae and some crustaceans. Young are reported to feed on detritus.

Utilization 
Osteochilus vittatus is an important fishery species in the Mekong and Chao Phraya basins. It is occasionally present in aquarium trade.

References

Osteochilus
Fish of the Mekong Basin
Fish of Myanmar
Fish of Cambodia
Freshwater fish of China
Freshwater fish of Indonesia
Fish of Laos
Freshwater fish of Malaysia
Fish of Thailand
Fish of Vietnam
Taxa named by Achille Valenciennes
Fish described in 1842